William Birnie Rhind RSA (1853–1933) was a Scottish sculptor.

Life

Rhind was born in Edinburgh on 27 February 1853 as the first son of sculptor John Rhind (1828–1892), and his wife, Catherine Birnie. He was the elder brother of J. Massey Rhind. The two brothers set up a studio in Glasgow in 1885, then Birnie moved to Edinburgh, and his brother went to Paris, then permanently to America in 1889, despite the warnings of their father. His younger brother was Thomas Duncan Rhind, an architect.

His name is particularly connected to several dozen sculptural war memorials in the Edinburgh and Lothian area. One of these is a monument to the Royal Scots Greys on Princes Street in Edinburgh. Also of note is the 1919 bronze figure of a fallen officer, telling his men to "carry on", which acts as the school war memorial at Fettes College, a private school in Edinburgh.

William died on 9 July 1933 and was buried with his parents, and Alice Stone (1862–1937), his wife, in the family plot in Warriston Cemetery, Edinburgh.

Works 

 "Virtue" panels on the memorial to the Duke of Buccleuch in front of St. Giles Cathedral, Edinburgh, 1887
 Lifeboat Monument, St Anne's on the Sea, 1888
 Sculpture on the Sun Life Insurance building in Glasgow (1889) commissioned by William Leiper
 Allegorical figures on Charing Cross Mansions, Glasgow, 1889–1891
 The Main Entrance Archway, West Ham Technical College, 1898
 Pulpit and font at St Mary's Collegiate Church, Haddington 1891
 Apollo Group, sculpture on the former Sun Life Building, Glasgow, 1889–1894
 Figures of angels and apostles inside Bellevue Reformed Baptist Church, East London Street, Edinburgh, 1894
 Pair of statues to Thomas and Peter Coats in Paisley, 1895
 Monument to Lord Belhaven and Stenton, Dean Cemetery, Edinburgh, 1896
 The seated figure of Science on the Kelvingrove Art Gallery and Museum, 1898
 Figures in niches on the Scottish National Portrait Gallery, Edinburgh, 1898
 Sculptural figures on a large memorial in Roslin churchyard, 1899
 Bronze portrait head of Dr James Cappie (1829–1899) in Grange Cemetery, Edinburgh (1899)
 Allegorical figures on the Scotsman Building, Edinburgh, 1900 (above North Bridge Arcade)
 Figures and panel on the former National Bank of Scotland branch, Glasgow, 1902–1903
 Last Supper panel within St Pauls Church, Lorne Street, Leith, 1903
 Monument to Sir Hector MacDonald, Dean Cemetery, Edinburgh, 1904
 Monument to soldiers killed in the Boer Wars, Alloa, 1904 (to a design by Robert Lorimer)
 Statue of William Light, founder of Adelaide, South Australia, designed 1904 and unveiled 1906 in the city of Adelaide
 The River Mersey, Navigation, and Commerce, with sculptor Edward O. Griffith, formerly on the Liverpool Cotton Exchange, 1905–1906
 Frieze within the old Lothian Region Chambers on George IV Bridge in Edinburgh, 1905
 Heads on corbels, Corstorphine Old Parish Church, Edinburgh, 1905
 Science on the Armstrong Building, Newcastle, 1906
 Sculpture on the entrance tower of Hawick Public Library 1906
 Monument to the King's Own Scottish Borderers on North Bridge, Edinburgh, 1906
 Monument of horse and rider to the Royal Scots Greys on Princes Street, Edinburgh, 1906
 Figures on the former R. W. Forsyth Department Store (corner of Princes Street and St. Andrew Street), Edinburgh, 1906
 Figure of St. Andrew on St. Andrew's Parish Church, North Berwick, 1907
 Monument to the Black Watch for the South African War (Boer War), The Mound, Edinburgh, 1908
 Monument to the poet Robert Burns, Montrose 1912
 Ashton Building at the University of Liverpool, 1912–1914
 City Arms on the Usher Hall, Edinburgh, 1914
 Allegory of Learning, two figures above portico of Shipley Art Gallery, Gateshead, 1917
 Four allegorical groupings representing Agriculture, Art, Industry and Learning at the base of the dome of the Manitoba Legislative Building, Winnipeg, 1918–1919
 Kelty War Memorial, 1921
 Buckie War Memorial, 1921
 New Brighton War Memorial, 1921
 Figure of a pensive soldier of 8th Battalion Royal Scots atop a commemorative plinth, Prestonpans War Memorial, 1922

Gallery

References

Further reading

External links
 

1853 births
1933 deaths
Scottish male sculptors
Artists from Edinburgh
Royal Scottish Academicians
19th-century British sculptors
20th-century British sculptors
Burials at Warriston Cemetery